Separate Tables is a 1958 American drama film starring Rita Hayworth, Deborah Kerr, David Niven, Burt Lancaster, and Wendy Hiller, based on two one-act plays by Terence Rattigan that were collectively known by this name. Niven and Hiller won Academy Awards for Best Actor and Best Supporting Actress respectively for their performances. The picture was directed by Delbert Mann and adapted for the screen by Rattigan, John Gay and an uncredited John Michael Hayes. Mary Grant and Edith Head designed the film's costumes.

Plot
The film is set in the Hotel Beauregard in Bournemouth on the south coast of England.  Major David Angus Pollock (David Niven) tries but fails to hide an article about himself in the West Hampshire Weekly News. His attempt to keep the article from the eyes of the other guests at the residential hotel only succeeds in heightening their awareness of it, particularly the strict Mrs Railton-Bell (Gladys Cooper) and the more relaxed and compassionate Lady Matheson (Cathleen Nesbitt). The two women read in the paper that Major Pollock has pled guilty to sexually harassing several young women in a theatre. However the filed complaints are, in themselves, questionable. Mrs Railton-Bell wants Major Pollock expelled from the hotel and holds a meeting with other long-term residents to decide the issue before presenting it to the manager, Miss Pat Cooper (Wendy Hiller). Mrs Railton-Bell leads the meeting arguing for the Major's expulsion, and despite the opposing views of the other residents, she informs Miss Cooper that the Major must leave.

Anne (Rita Hayworth) and John (Burt Lancaster), who were formerly married to one another, meet outside. Anne coolly teases John, informing him that she is engaged; John tells her he is engaged as well, but does not disclose that he is engaged to Miss Cooper. John claims that though Anne could have married other men who were wealthier and more important, she chose him, a man in a lower economic class, in order to manipulate and degrade him fully. Despite this, John and Anne admit they are still attracted to each other. She asks him to come to her room.

As they walk into the hotel, Miss Cooper tells Anne she has a phone call. Miss Cooper asks John, knowing Anne is his ex-wife, to consider the real reason for Anne's visit. John defends Anne at first, claiming that all his misfortunes are his own fault, but changes his mind when Miss Cooper tells him that Anne is talking on the phone to his publisher, the only person who knows that John and Miss Cooper are engaged. John confronts Anne in her bedroom. When she attempts to seduce him, he cruelly tells her that, in the light, he can see that she has aged and without her physical beauty it will be impossible for her to continue to manipulate people. She begs him to stay, but he runs out of the hotel after striking her. Anne has an emotional breakdown, and Miss Cooper comforts her. Anne reveals that she is not really engaged and has been abusing sleeping pills to ease her pain, even during the day.

The next morning, Mrs Railton-Bell's downtrodden daughter Sibyl (Deborah Kerr) tells Major Pollock that she knows what he did. He explains that he always has been fearful of people and that it is easier for him to attempt to be familiar with strangers. Major Pollock tells Sibyl that he and she get along well with each other because they are both afraid of life. As he returns to his room to pack, Sibyl worries he will not find a new home.

When John returns in the morning, Miss Cooper tells him that Anne is emotionally unwell, and asks him to see her before she checks out of the hotel. After John leaves, Miss Cooper attempts to persuade Major Pollock to stay, but he refuses. The hotel residents eat their breakfast at separate tables in the dining room. John and Anne appear to reconcile, but they do not know if they can ever be happy, together or apart.

When Major Pollock enters the room, there is an awkward silence until John greets him. The others do the same and cheerfully converse with him. Mrs Railton-Bell is angered by this and demands Sibyl leave with her. Sibyl refuses to obey her mother's command for the first time ever, and insists on remaining to finish her breakfast. After her mother leaves, she starts to talk to Major Pollock, who decides to stay on at the hotel.

Cast

 Rita Hayworth as Anne Shankland
 Deborah Kerr as Sibyl Railton-Bell
 David Niven as Major David Angus Pollock
 Burt Lancaster as John Malcolm
 Wendy Hiller as Pat Cooper
 Gladys Cooper as Mrs. Maud Railton-Bell
 Cathleen Nesbitt as Lady Gladys Matheson
 Felix Aylmer as Mr. Fowler
 Rod Taylor as Charles
 Audrey Dalton as Jean
 May Hallatt as Miss Meacham 
 Priscilla Morgan as Doreen

Production
The film took the two plays and opened them to create a screenplay that introduced some new parts, and stars Rita Hayworth, Deborah Kerr, David Niven, Wendy Hiller, Burt Lancaster, and May Hallatt, who already played Miss Meacham on stage. Varitey wrote "Rattigan and John Gay have masterfully blended the two playlets into one literate and absorbing full-length film." The film was nominated for seven Oscars, Best Picture, Best Actress (Kerr), Best Writing, Adapted Screenplay, Best Cinematography (Black and White), and Best Dramatic or Comedy Score, and won two (Niven for Best Actor and Hiller for Best Supporting Actress).

Top billing was divided between Deborah Kerr and Rita Hayworth: Hayworth was billed above Kerr in the posters while Kerr was billed above Hayworth in the film itself, a practice followed by James Stewart and John Wayne four years later for The Man Who Shot Liberty Valance and later by Robert Redford and Dustin Hoffman in All the President's Men (1976).

Burt Lancaster was also co-producer (Clifton Productions, a subsidiary of Hecht-Hill-Lancaster Productions). Rita Hayworth was married to James Hill at the time.

Rod Taylor agreed to play a small part in the film because of the quality of the production.

Awards and nominations

David Niven won the Academy Award for Best Actor for his role, setting the current record for the shortest performance to win the award.

Home media
Separate Tables was released to DVD by MGM Home Video on December 11, 2001, as a Region 1 widescreen DVD and by Kino Lorber (under license from MGM) to Blu-ray on July 29, 2014.

References

External links
 
  
 

1958 films
1958 romantic drama films
1950s English-language films
American black-and-white films
American films based on plays
American romantic drama films
Films based on works by Terence Rattigan
Films directed by Delbert Mann
Films featuring a Best Actor Academy Award-winning performance
Films featuring a Best Drama Actor Golden Globe winning performance
Films featuring a Best Supporting Actress Academy Award-winning performance
Films produced by Burt Lancaster
Films produced by James Hill
Films produced by Harold Hecht
Films scored by David Raksin
Films set in Dorset
Films set in hotels
Films with screenplays by John Gay (screenwriter)
Films with screenplays by Terence Rattigan
Norma Productions films
United Artists films
1950s American films